Ihor Sholin, (4 June 1985 – 16 December 2009) was a professional Ukrainian football midfielder.

Career
He played for FC Nizhyn, FC Nistru Otaci, FC Karpaty Lviv, FC Nafkom Brovary, FC Dacia Chişinău and FC Dynamo Khmelnytskyi.

18 July 2009 had an accident. At 12.10 on the highway Stryi – Znamianka near the village of Verbka, the bus "LAZ" with team of FC Dynamo Khmelnytskyi was driving in the direction of Vinnytsia at the cup match against FC Irpin Horenychi. At this time heading in the opposite direction the car "Gazel", which inexplicably went into the oncoming lane and crashed into a bus. The accident injured three passengers buses – Andriy Lemishevskyi, Serhiy Yakubovskyi and Ihor Sholin all of them were taken to the Khmelnytsky Regional Hospital. Yakubovskyi and Lemishevskyi came to their senses and Sholin nearly six months, fell into a coma.

16 December 2009 in Khmelnytsky Oblast Clinical Hospital Ihor's heart stopped. 17 December held a farewell to the stadium Sholin "Podillya". He was buried in his hometown Nizhyn.

External links

Ukrainian footballers
FC Nistru Otaci players
FC Karpaty Lviv players
FC Dacia Chișinău players
FC Dynamo Khmelnytskyi players
1985 births
2009 deaths
Association football midfielders
Footballers from Nizhyn